James J. Collins (born June 26, 1965) is an American bioengineer, and the Termeer Professor of Medical Engineering & Science and Professor of Biological Engineering at MIT.

He is one of the founders of the emerging field of synthetic biology, and has made multiple synthetic biology breakthroughs in biotechnology and biomedicine, including paper-based diagnostics for Zika & Ebola and programmable cells that serve as living diagnostics and living therapeutics to detect-and-treat infections, rare genetic metabolic disorders, and inflammatory bowel disease. Collins is also a pioneering researcher in systems biology, having made fundamental discoveries regarding the actions of antibiotics and the emergence of antibiotic resistance.

Collins was elected a member of the National Academy of Engineering in 2011 for contributions to synthetic biology and engineered gene networks.

Biography 
Collins received a bachelor's degree in physics (summa cum laude; class valedictorian) from the College of the Holy Cross in 1987 and a doctorate in Medical Engineering from the University of Oxford in 1990.  From 1987 to 1990, he was a Rhodes Scholar.  Currently, Collins is the Termeer Professor of Medical Engineering & Science and Professor of Biological Engineering at MIT. Collins is also a core founding faculty member of the Wyss Institute for Biologically Inspired Engineering at Harvard University and an Institute Member of the Broad Institute at MIT and Harvard. Collins is also faculty lead for life sciences at the MIT Jameel Clinic since 2018.

From 1990 to 2014, he was on the faculty at Boston University, where he was a William F. Warren Distinguished Professor, a University Professor, Professor of Biomedical Engineering, and Co-Director of the Center for BioDynamics and Director of the Center of Synthetic Biology.

Collins' scientific accomplishments have been recognized by numerous awards, including the NIH Director's Pioneer Award, the Ellison Medical Foundation Senior Scholar Award in Aging, the inaugural Anthony J. Drexel Exceptional Achievement Award, the Lagrange Prize from the CRT Foundation in Italy, the Sanofi-Institut Pasteur Award, the BMES Robert A. Pritzker Award, the HFSP Nakasone Award, the Promega Biotechnology Research Award, and being selected for Technology Review's inaugural TR100 – 100 young innovators who will shape the future of technology – and the Scientific American 50 – the top 50 outstanding leaders in science and technology.  Collins is also a Fellow of the American Physical Society, the Institute of Physics, and the American Institute for Medical and Biological Engineering.  In 2003, he received a MacArthur Foundation "Genius Award", becoming the first bioengineer to receive this honor.  Collins' award citation noted, "Throughout his research, Collins demonstrates a proclivity for identifying abstract principles that underlie complex biological phenomena and for using these concepts to solve concrete, practical problems.".  He was also honored as a Medical All-Star by the Boston Red Sox, and threw out the first pitch at a Red Sox game in Fenway Park. In 2016, Collins was named an Allen Distinguished Investigator by the Paul G. Allen Frontiers Group. Collins is an elected member of all three U.S. national academies – the National Academy of Sciences, the National Academy of Engineering, and the National Academy of Medicine.  He is also an elected fellow of the American Academy of Arts and Sciences, as well as a charter fellow of the National Academy of Inventors.

Collins is a gifted and committed teacher. He has won numerous teaching awards at Boston University, including the Biomedical Engineering Teacher of the Year Award, the College of Engineering Professor of the Year Award, and the Metcalf Cup and Prize for Excellence in Teaching, which is the highest teaching honor awarded by Boston University.

Collins has been involved with a number of start-up companies, and his inventions and technologies have been licensed by several biotech and medical device companies.  Collins is the scientific co-founder and currently chairs the Scientific Advisory Board (SAB) of Sample6 Technologies, Synlogic and EnBiotix.  He serves on the Board of Directors of Fulcrum Therapeutics and the SAB of Agilis Biotherapeutics, Evelo Biosciences, enEvolv, Indigo Agriculture, Joule Unlimited, PureTech Health and Excel Medical Ventures.  Additionally, he has served on the SAB of Mannkind Corporation, Seres Health, Codon Devices, Selventa, Gene Network Sciences, Epitome Biosystems, Afferent Corp, Cellicon Biotechnologies, Synereca Pharmaceuticals, LifeWave Ltd, and Bios Group Inc. Collins has also served as a science advisor to Unilever, Lifebuoy, Agilent, Momenta Pharmaceuticals, the New England Patriots, and Brooks Sports.

Collins ran track and cross country at Holy Cross (he was a 4:17 miler), and earned a blue playing for the varsity basketball team at the University of Oxford.

Work 
Collins has pioneered the development and use of nonlinear dynamical approaches to study, mimic and improve biological function, and helped to transform biology into an engineering science.  His current research interests include: synthetic biology – modeling, designing and constructing synthetic gene networks, and systems biology – reverse engineering naturally occurring gene regulatory networks.

Collins has invented a number of novel devices and techniques, including vibrating insoles for enhancing balance, a prokaryotic riboregulator, bistable genetic toggle switches for biotechnology and bioenergy applications, dynamical control techniques for eliminating cardiac arrhythmias, and systems biology techniques for identifying drug targets and disease mediators.

Collins proposed that input noise could be used to enhance sensory function and motor control in humans.  He and collaborators showed that touch sensation and balance control in young and older adults, patients with stroke, and patients with diabetic neuropathy could be improved with the application of sub-sensory mechanical noise, e.g., via vibrating insoles.  This work has led to the creation of a new class of medical devices to address complications resulting from diabetic neuropathy, restore brain function following stroke, and improve elderly balance.

Collins has pioneered the use of techniques from nonlinear dynamics and molecular biology to model, design and construct engineered gene networks, leading to the development of the field of synthetic biology. Collins and collaborators have created genetic toggle switches, RNA switches, genetic counters, programmable cells, tunable mammalian genetic switches, and engineered bacteriophage, each with broad applications in biotechnology and biomedicine.

Collins is also one of the leading researchers in systems biology, pioneering the use of experimental-computational biophysical techniques to reverse engineer and analyze endogenous gene regulatory networks.  Collins and collaborators showed that reverse-engineered gene networks can be used to identify drug targets, biological mediators and disease biomarkers.

Collins and collaborators discovered, using systems biology approaches, that all classes of bactericidal antibiotics induce a common oxidative damage cellular death pathway.
  This finding indicates that targeting bacterials systems that remediate oxidative damage, including the SOS DNA damage response, is a viable means of enhancing the effectiveness of all major classes of antibiotics and limiting the emergence of antibiotic resistance.  Collins and co-workers also discovered that sublethal levels of antibiotics activate mutagenesis by stimulating the production of reactive oxygen species, leading to multidrug resistance.  This discovery has important implications for the widespread use and misuse of antibiotics.  Recently, Collins and colleagues, using their systems approaches, discovered a population-based resistance mechanism constituting a form of kin selection whereby a small number of resistant bacterial mutants, in the face of antibiotic stress, can, at some cost to themselves, provide protection to other more vulnerable, cells, enhancing the survival capacity of the overall population in stressful environments.

In 2020, Collins was part of the team—with fellow MIT Jameel Clinic faculty lead Professor Regina Barzilay—that announced the discovery through deep learning of halicin, the first new antibiotic compound for 30 years, which kills over 35 powerful bacteria, including antimicrobial-resistant tuberculosis, the superbug C. difficile, and two of the World Health Organization's top-three most deadly bacteria. In 2020, Collins, Barzilay and the MIT Jameel Clinic were also awarded funding through The Audacious Project to expand on the discovery of halicin in using AI to respond to the antibiotic resistance crisis through the development of new classes of antibiotics.

References

External links
 Collins Lab @ MIT
 Jim Collins' faculty webpage @ the Wyss Institute, Harvard University

1965 births
Living people
Scientists from New York City
American Rhodes Scholars
Boston University faculty
College of the Holy Cross alumni
MacArthur Fellows
People from Nashua, New Hampshire
Complex systems scientists
Systems biologists
Synthetic biologists
Howard Hughes Medical Investigators
Fellows of the American Academy of Arts and Sciences
Members of the United States National Academy of Engineering
Members of the United States National Academy of Sciences
Members of the National Academy of Medicine
Fellows of the American Physical Society